

Codes

References

I